Mário Gil Andrade Fernandes (born 25 April 1982) is a Portuguese basketball player who has most notably played for Benfica, having also represented his local club CAB Madeira, AAC Coimbra, Swedish side Jämtland Basket, Spanish sides Balneario de Archena and CB Plasencia, and Ovarense. He measures 1.74 meters and plays as a point guard.

Honours
Benfica
 Portuguese League: 2013–14, 2014–15, 2016–17
 Portuguese Cup: 2013–14, 2014–15, 2015–16, 2016–17
 League Cup / Hugo dos Santos Cup: 2013–14, 2014–15, 2016–17
 António Pratas Trophy: 2014, 2015
 Portuguese Super Cup: 2013, 2014, 2015

External links
 Benfica official profile 
 EuroBasket 2007 profile

1982 births
Living people
Portuguese men's basketball players
Jämtland Basket players
S.L. Benfica basketball players
Point guards